Tauno Valdemar Palo (born Tauno Brännäs; 25 October 1908 – 24 May 1982) was a Finnish actor and singer in what some consider the golden age of Finnish cinema.

In Guide to the Cinema of Sweden and Finland Peter von Bagh names Palo as the most renowned, the best-loved, and quite indisputably the greatest and the best actor of Finnish cinema. His skill to combine lightweight and youthful charm with heavyweight acting was seen most clearly in the theatre.  

His most famous roles were perhaps in Kulkurin valssi ("The Vagabond's Waltz"), and Vaimoke ("Surrogate Wife"). He appeared with actress/singer Birgit Kronström in the 1941 romantic comedy "Onnellinen ministeri" ("The Lucky Cabinet Minister"), which included the famous song "Katupoikien laulu", remade by other Finnish pop singers including Katri Helena.

Life and career 
Palo was born in Hämeenlinna as Tauno Brännäs, but changed his name to Tauno Palo in 1935. He was of partial Russian descent through his mother Olga Andersson whose father was a Russian soldier and mother a Finnish maid. Palo recruited in the military and was educated as a chemist. His friend invited him to join the theatre of Working Men's Club in Sörnäinen. Theatre director and famous actor Aarne Orjatsalo became his mentor. The dark-haired lad from Sörnäinen who had a good voice got attention, and in 1931 he was invited to auction for film studios. His final breakthrough came when era of silent films was over, and people could hear his voice.

Palo left his work as chemist in 1932. He was hired by the Finnish National Theatre, but until 1938 he got only small roles, because his popularity as a film star harmed his credibility on the stage. 

Ansa Ikonen played as his leading lady in 12 films and in numerous plays and on tours. In eyes of the public, they became the most romantic couple ever. In real life they did not have a romantic relationship.

Palo had in total over 300 roles on stage and played in 65 feature films.

Before the Second World War Palo recorded a number of songs from the musical films he acted in. He continued his recording career after 1967. He died in Helsinki.

Selected filmography
 Jääkärin morsian (1931) (as Tauno Brännas)
 Kaikki rakastavat (1935) ("Everybody's Love", romantic comedy)
 Vaimoke (1936) ("Surrogate Wife")
 SF-paraati (1940) ("SF Parade", the first Finnish musical comedy)
 Kulkurin valssi (1941) ("The Vagabond's Waltz")
 Rosvo-Roope (1949) ("Rob the Robber")
 The Milkmaid (1953)
 It Began in the Rain (1953)
 The Unknown Soldier (1955)
 The Scarlet Dove (1961) – final film role

Highlights on stage 
 Anton Chekhov: Uncle Vanya (as Dr Astrov)
 Aleksis Kivi: Seitsemän veljestä (as Juhani)
 Henrik Ibsen: Doll house (as Dr Rank)
 Tennessee Williams: A Streetcar Named Desire (as Stanley)
 Georg Büchner: Danton's death (as Danton)
 Josef Julius Wecksell: Daniel Hjort  (as Olavi)

Selected discography 
 Tuulikki 1934 (Odeon A 228258) – a waltz
 Tuohinen sormus 1934 (Odeon A 228282) – a jenkka
 Syksyn tullessa 1935 (Odeon A 228327) –  a waltz
 Mieheke 1936 (Odeon A 228359) – a jenkka
 Marjatta 1936 (Odeon A 228360) – a tango
 Sinä semmoinen, minä tämmöinen 1936 (Odeon 228370) – a jenkka
 Nuoruuden sävel 1940 (Odeon A 228590) from film SF-paraati
 Tauno Palo & Ansa Ikonen: Pot-pot-pot 1940 (Odeon A 228590) from film SF-paraati
 Näenhän valoisan taivaan 1940 (Odeon A 228615) from film SF-paraati
 Soittoniekka 1942 (Columbia DY 386) – a ballad
 Ruusu on punainen 1967 (RCA FAS 985) – comeback with a German schlager arranged by Aarno Raninen
 Rosvo-Roope 1968 (RCA EPS 222) – finally recorded melody from eponymous film
 Tauno Palo & Ansa Ikonen: Ansa & Tauno 1974 (Kiss RPLP 5007) – LP, including Kulkurin valssi

References

External links

1908 births
1982 deaths
People from Hämeenlinna
People from Häme Province (Grand Duchy of Finland)
20th-century Finnish male actors
Finnish people of Russian descent